Colton Brown (born October 8, 1991) is an American judoka.

He competed at the 2016 Summer Olympics in Rio de Janeiro, in the men's 90 kg. Brown stated that the Olympic selection was a "dream come true" and that "It felt as though a lifetime of work was finally paying off.". He competed again at the 2020 Summer Olympics, where he was the only American man in the judo competitions. He was eliminated in the round of 16 by Mihael Zgank of Turkey.

Early career
Colton Brown begun his career in judo at the age of 17. His father was a judoka and Brown would go with his father to practice.

References

External links
 
 

1991 births
Living people
American male judoka
Olympic judoka of the United States
Judoka at the 2016 Summer Olympics
Judoka at the 2020 Summer Olympics